Simon Rouse (born 24 June 1951) is an English actor, best known for playing the role of Detective Chief Inspector, later Superintendent, Jack Meadows in the long-running ITV police drama The Bill.

He first appeared on The Bill as Detective Superintendent Jack Meadows, drafted in from the Major Incident Team. The character became a regular from 1992 when he was demoted to Detective Chief Inspector until the show's cancellation in 2010.

Rouse was born in Heaton, Bradford, West Riding of Yorkshire. Prior to The Bill, he had a long career working mainly with the BBC, appearing twice in their Play for Tomorrow strand, a sci-fi offshoot of the Play for Today series. He also guest starred in the 1982 Doctor Who story Kinda as the deranged Hindle, and played an unnamed character simply credited as "Yizzel's mate" in Carla Lane's Bread in 1986. In 1988 he played Graham Farrell, a business associate of Mike Baldwin in Coronation Street.

He also appeared in films, including The Ragman's Daughter (1972), Butley (1974), Pop Pirates (1984) and Parker (1985).

He later played the role of another police officer, Detective Sergeant Vernon Cooper, in Operation Julie, a three-hour dramatisation (shown in three parts) of the real-life drugs investigation. Coincidentally, Robert Gwilym also appeared as Detective Constable Dan Richard: he would return opposite Rouse for a recurring role in The Bill in 2004.

He has also guest starred on such shows as Boon, Robin of Sherwood, The Professionals, Casualty and Minder.

He also appeared in EastEnders in 1990 playing the role of Superintendent Alan Millward.

Rouse appeared in J.B. Priestley's When We Are Married, playing Albert Parker. The production ran at London's Garrick Theatre from 19 October 2010 to 26 February 2011 and also starred Maureen Lipman and Sam Kelly. In February and March 2012 he appeared in The Bomb, a series of short plays about nuclear weapons at the Tricycle Theatre in Kilburn.

In 2013, he appeared in Coronation Street as Lewis Archer's old friend Patrick Woodson, and as journalist Len Danvers in Broadchurch. The same year Rouse toured the UK in a stage production of Simon Beaufoy's 1997 comedy-drama film The Full Monty, in which he plays the role of Gerald. He continued playing the role in the West End in 2014, at the Noël Coward Theatre.

References

External links

1951 births
Living people
English male television actors
Male actors from Bradford
People educated at Belle Vue Boys' Grammar School, Bradford